The women's road race of the 2005 UCI Road World Championships cycling event took place on 24 September in Madrid, Spain. The race was 127.8 km long and was won by the German rider Regina Schleicher in a bunch sprint.

Final classification

Did not finish
25 riders failed to finish the race.

References

Women's Road Race
UCI Road World Championships – Women's road race
2005 in women's road cycling